"One of a Kind Pair of Fools" is a song written by R.C. Bannon and John Bettis, and recorded by American country music artist Barbara Mandrell.  It was released in July 1983 as the second and final single from the album Spun Gold.  The song was the last of six number one country singles for Mandrell. The single went to number one for one week and spent a total of fourteen weeks on the country chart.

Chart performance

References

External links
 

1983 singles
1983 songs
Barbara Mandrell songs
Songs written by R.C. Bannon
Songs with lyrics by John Bettis
Song recordings produced by Tom Collins (record producer)
MCA Records singles
Songs about infidelity